Mohamad Ervan (born 1992) is an Indonesian chess player. He was awarded the title of International Master in 2019.

Chess career
Ervan won the Indonesian Chess Championship in 2018.

After his sixth-place performance in the 2021 Asian Individual Hybrid Chess Championships, where he was seeded 36th, he qualified for the Chess World Cup 2021 where he was drawn against Nodirbek Abdusattorov in the first round. He was defeated in their first game, but failed a COVID-19 test before their second game, handing the tie to his opponent by walkover.

References

External links

1992 births
Living people
Chess Olympiad competitors
Indonesian chess players
Competitors at the 2021 Southeast Asian Games
Southeast Asian Games silver medalists for Indonesia
Southeast Asian Games medalists in chess
21st-century Indonesian people